South High School was a public high school in the city of Youngstown, Ohio, United States. It was built in 1909 was closed following the 1992–1993 school year.  The building currently houses Eagle Heights Academy.

The South Warriors wore the colors of red and blue and participated in the Youngstown City Series.

Notable alumni
 Major General Wilbur F. Simlik, US Marine Corps, Fiscal Director of the Marine Corps
 Major General Robert F. Durkin, US Air Force, director of Defense Mapping Agency
Fred Mundee, American football player
Simeon Booker, Civil Rights journalist, Jet Magazine
Judge Nathaniel R. Jones, retired U.S. District Court judge, participant in Nelson Mandela government transition
Bob Dove, American football player and coach

References

External links
 District Website
 1974 Warrior, South High School Yearbook

High schools in Mahoning County, Ohio
Education in Youngstown, Ohio
Defunct schools in Ohio
1909 establishments in Ohio
1993 disestablishments in Ohio